Ryan Porter is an American jazz trombonist. Based in Los Angeles, he is a founding member of the West Coast Get Down jazz collective. A longtime collaborator of West Coast Get Down saxophonist Kamasi Washington, he has also toured with Stevie Wonder, Rihanna, Kanye West, Snoop Dogg, Lauryn Hill, and Nick Cave and the Bad Seeds.

Early life 

Ryan Porter was born on July 31, 1979, in Los Angeles, California. He was introduced to jazz by his grandfather, who had a large jazz record collection. He was first drawn to the trombone after seeing the cover of J. J. Johnson's album Proof Positive.

In high school, he was a member of the Multi-School Jazz Band in Watts under the direction of Reggie Andrews, in which he played alongside Kamasi Washington, Terrace Martin, Stephen "Thundercat" Bruner, and Ronald Bruner Jr., who would later be his bandmates in the West Coast Get Down. He participated in the inaugural Vail Jazz Workshop in 1996, where he met trumpeter Roy Hargrove. From 1997 to 2001, he attended the Manhattan School of Music, where he studied under jazz trombonists Steve Turre and David Taylor.

Career 

Between 2008 and 2009, Porter and his West Coast Get Down bandmates held a series of recording sessions in Kamasi Washington's parents' garage, which they called "the Shack." These sessions were cramped, overheated, and frequently interrupted by planes at the nearby Los Angeles International Airport landing strip. The recordings were released a decade later on Porter's album The Optimist (2018), whose title was inspired by Porter's optimism for the newly elected president Barack Obama at the time of recording. The album was released on World Galaxy and Alpha Pup Records. 

In December 2011, Porter participated in the West Coast Get Down's Kingsize Soundlabs sessions, where the collective spent 30 straight days recording songs for seven different albums including Washington's The Epic (2015). Porter led a portion of these sessions, yielding the tracks on his debut album Spangle-Lang Lane (2017), a collection of reimagined children's songs reimagined in a soulful jazz and hip hop style. With the album, he released a series of videos depicting puppet versions of the West Coast Get Down and other jazz musicians.

In June 2019, Porter released his third album Force for Good, which was recorded over the course of five years and also features Kamasi Washington.

Discography 

Adapted from AllMusic.

Studio albums 

 Spangle-Lang Lane (2017)
 The Optimist (2018)
 Force for Good (2019)

With Kamasi Washington 

 The Epic (2015)
 Harmony of Difference (2017)
 Heaven and Earth (2018)
 Becoming (2020)

References

External links 
 
 
 

Living people
1979 births
Manhattan School of Music alumni
American jazz trombonists
21st-century American male musicians